Character Chronicle Cards is a supplement for fantasy role-playing games published by Judges Guild in 1978.

Contents
Character Chronicle Cards is a player's aid: small character record sheets printed on durable cardstock.

Publication history
Character Chronicle Cards was published by Judges Guild in 1978 as 100 digest-sized cards.

Reception
 Don Turnbull reviewed Character Chronicle Cards for White Dwarf #3. Turnbull commented: "Very useful for DMs who wish to pre-generate characters and maintain a file as a source of hirelings, new player characters and non-player characters. Of less value for the player who continually has to update information since they are rather small. Perhaps rather expensive, too, for what they are."

References

Judges Guild fantasy role-playing game supplements
Role-playing game supplements introduced in 1978